Sitsi (Estonian for "Chintz") is a subdistrict in the district of Põhja-Tallinn, Tallinn, the capital of Estonia. It has a population of 3,874.

Gallery

References

Subdistricts of Tallinn